The Type 925 Dajiang with NATO reporting name Dajiang, or 大江 in Chinese, meaning Great River, is  a type of naval auxiliary ship belonging to the People's Republic of China. Each ship is usually equipped with up to two Type 7103 DSRV class Deep Submergence Rescue Vehicles (DSRVs). The ship is designed to replace the first People's Liberation Army Navy (PLAN) submarine tender PLANS Mount Tai, and the lead ship of the Dajiang class is the Changxingdao. The Type 925 is a submarine tender that can also be used as a submarine rescue ship, and hence, it is designated as a submarine support ship (Qian-Ting Zhi-Yuan Jian, 潜艇支援舰) by Chinese.

Each ship has a crew of 308 sailors and is equipped with an aft helicopter deck and hangars for 2 Z-8 Super Frelon helicopters. These large multi role naval auxiliary ships are the most fexilible type in the Chinese navy, capable of performing a variety of tasks, including serving as a submarine rescue ship (ARS), marine salvage rescue ship (ASR), submarine tender (AS), and surface ship's tender.  Two Type 7103 DSRVs can be carried during submarine rescue operations and they are handled by a large crane on the fore deck, though usually, only one Type 7103 DSRV is carried while the slot for the second is used for a Type 7103 training submersible, which is used to simulate stranded submarines in training exercises.  The handling system of Type 7103 DSRV is also used for Sea Pole class bathyscaphes and Osprey class submersibles.  With only slight modifications, Type 925 Dajiang class is capable of supporting all submersibles and Unmanned underwater vehicles (UUVs) in the Chinese inventory, including:
 Mobile diving bell
 QSZ-II submersible
 8A4 ROUVs
 RECON-IV ROUVs
 7B8 ROUVs
 Goldfish class ROUVs
 HR-01 ROUV
 HR-02 ROUV
 JH-01 ROUV
 SJT-5 ROUV
 SJT-10 ROUV
 SJT-40 ROUV
 Sea Dragon-I ROUV
 Sea Dragon-II ROUV
 Arctic class ARV
 Explorer AUV
 WZODA AUV
 CR-01 AUV
 CR-01A AUV
 CR-02 AUV
 Intelligent Water class AUV
 Submerged Dragon 1 AUV

During the Chinese ICBM test in the early 1980s, one of the Type 925 Dajiang class was converted as missile instrumentation support ship and temporarily renamed as Yuanwang-3 (远望-3) to support the test, and after the conclusion of the test, the unit was converted back to its original role with the name consequently changed back.

With a displacement of 10,087 tons full, and a length of 512½ feet, this ship  can reach a speed of  powered by two MAN diesels producing  delivered to the two driveshafts.  The ships were built by Hudong SY, Shanghai. The Dajiang class submarine ship has three vessels.  They are named as follows:
 Changxingdao #121 (built in 1976)
 Chongmingdao #302
 Yongxingdao #506
A new more modern Type 925 class has also recently been built, comprising:
 Yongxingdao 863 Replacing the # 506 with the same name.

See also
 Deep Submergence Rescue Vehicle
 Military of the People's Republic of China

References

External links 
 China's Future Route to Maritime Dominance
 Annual Report to Congress:  Military Power of the People’s Republic of China 2007
 Current submarine rescue services, Jane's Information Group

Deep-submergence vehicles
Submarines of the People's Liberation Army Navy
Auxiliary ships of the People's Liberation Army Navy
Submarine rescue ships
Auxiliary search and rescue ship classes
Auxiliary depot ship classes